Paulo de Almeida Ribeiro, best known as "Paulinho" (15 April 1932 – 11 June 2007) was a Brazilian football player. He played for the Brazil national team. He was also part of Brazil's squad for the football tournament at the 1952 Summer Olympics, but he did not play in any matches.

Honours
Internacional
 Campeonato Gaúcho: 1951, 1952, 1953.

Vasco da Gama
 Campeonato Carioca: 1956, 1958
 Torneio Rio-São Paulo: 1958

References

1932 births
2007 deaths
Brazilian footballers
Brazil international footballers
1954 FIFA World Cup players
Brazilian football managers
Campeonato Brasileiro Série A players
Campeonato Brasileiro Série A managers
Sport Club Internacional players
CR Vasco da Gama players
Club Atlético River Plate footballers
Sport Club Internacional managers
CR Vasco da Gama managers
Olaria Atlético Clube managers
Clube Náutico Capibaribe managers
Bangu Atlético Clube managers
Botafogo de Futebol e Regatas managers
Esporte Clube Vitória managers
America Football Club (RJ) managers
Clube do Remo managers
Coritiba Foot Ball Club managers
Sport Club do Recife managers
Ceará Sporting Club managers
Vila Nova Futebol Clube managers
Campo Grande Atlético Clube managers
Grêmio Foot-Ball Porto Alegrense managers
Sociedade Esportiva Palmeiras managers
Fluminense FC managers
Clube Atlético Mineiro managers
Esporte Clube Bahia managers
Rio Branco Atlético Clube managers
Santa Cruz Futebol Clube managers
São Paulo FC managers
Paysandu Sport Club managers
Joinville Esporte Clube managers
Moto Club de São Luís managers
Association football defenders
Deaths from dementia in Brazil
Deaths from Alzheimer's disease